Forchheimer spots are a type of enanthem seen as tiny red spots on the soft palate in rubella, measles and scarlet fever. They sometimes precede the skin rash of rubella.

The spots may be present in around 20% of people with rubella. The sign is named after Frederick Forchheimer.

References 

Medical signs
Measles
Rubella
Scarlet fever